Bob Hewitt and Frew McMillan were the defending champions, but lost in the semifinals to Ken Rosewall and Fred Stolle.

John Newcombe and Tony Roche beat Rosewall and Stolle in the final, 3–6, 8–6, 5–7, 14–12, 6–3 to win the gentlemen's doubles title at the 1968 Wimbledon Championships.

Seeds

  Roy Emerson /  Rod Laver (semifinals) 
  Ken Rosewall /  Fred Stolle (final)
  Andrés Gimeno /  Pancho Gonzales (third round)
  John Newcombe /  Tony Roche (champions)
  Butch Buchholz /  Dennis Ralston (quarterfinals)
  Bob Hewitt /  Frew McMillan (semifinals)
  Tom Okker /  Marty Riessen (first round) 
  Cliff Drysdale /  Roger Taylor (quarterfinals)

Draw

Finals

Top half

Section 1

Section 2

Bottom half

Section 3

Section 4

References

External links

1968 Wimbledon Championships – Men's draws and results at the International Tennis Federation

Men's Doubles
Wimbledon Championship by year – Men's doubles